Delaware College of Art and Design (DCAD) is a Private art school in Wilmington, Delaware. It was founded in 1997 through a partnership between the Pratt Institute and the Corcoran College of Art and Design. It is accredited by the Middle States Commission on Higher Education and the National Association of Schools of Art and Design.

Campus
DCAD offers academic facilities at 600 N. Market St., and in the next block to the north at 707 N. King Street. A multimillion-dollar ($4.7M) expansion in student housing opened for Fall 2012 at 707 N. King Street in response to a significant increase in requests for on-campus residency. The former hotel's kitchen has been transformed into a student cafeteria for all resident and commuting students.  The 600 North Market building was the initial opening site for the college with an entering student population of 50.

DCAD's downtown Wilmington location is in the former Delmarva Power headquarters building at 600 N. Market St.  The building has been converted for use as studio and classroom space, as well as administrative offices for DCAD faculty and staff. The building was built in the Art Deco style with an Aztec motif.

See also
 List of art schools
 List of colleges and universities in Delaware
 National Register of Historic Places listings in Wilmington, Delaware

References

External links
 Official website

Art schools in Delaware
Private universities and colleges in Delaware
Buildings and structures in Wilmington, Delaware
Two-year colleges in the United States
Educational institutions established in 1997
University and college buildings on the National Register of Historic Places in Delaware
Art Deco architecture in Delaware
Education in New Castle County, Delaware
Tourist attractions in Wilmington, Delaware
National Register of Historic Places in Wilmington, Delaware
1997 establishments in Delaware